The Curse of the Colonel refers to a 1985 Japanese urban legend regarding a reputed curse placed on the Japanese Kansai-based Hanshin Tigers baseball team by the ghost of deceased KFC founder and mascot Colonel Sanders.

The curse was said to be placed on the team because of the Colonel's anger over treatment of one of his store-front statues, which was thrown into the Dōtonbori River by celebrating Hanshin fans before their team's victory in the 1985 Japan Championship Series. As is common with sports-related curses, the Curse of the Colonel was used to explain the team's subsequent 18-year losing streak. Some fans believed the team would never win another Japan Series until the statue had been recovered. They have appeared in the Japan Series three times since then, losing in 2003, 2005 and 2014.

Comparisons are often made between the Hanshin Tigers and the Boston Red Sox, who were said to be under the Curse of the Bambino until they won the World Series in 2004. The "Curse of the Colonel" has also been used as a bogeyman threat to those who would divulge the secret recipe of eleven herbs and spices that result in the unique taste of his chicken.

History

1985 Japan Series 
The Hanshin Tigers are located in Kansai, the second largest metropolitan area in Japan. They are considered the eternal underdogs of Nippon Professional Baseball, in opposition to the Yomiuri Giants of Tokyo, who are considered the kings of Japanese baseball. The devoted fans flock to the stadium no matter how badly the Tigers play in the league.

In 1985, much to the nation's surprise, the Hanshin Tigers faced the Seibu Lions and took their first and only victory in the Japan Series, largely due to the efforts of star slugger Randy Bass, an American playing for the team.

The fan base went wild, and a riotous celebration gathered at Ebisu Bridge in Dōtonbori, Osaka on October 16, three weeks before the Japan Series. There, an assemblage of supporters yelled the players' names, and with every name, a fan resembling a member of the victorious team leaped from the bridge into the waiting canal. However, lacking a Caucasian person to imitate MVP Randy Bass, the rabid crowd seized a plastic statue of Colonel Sanders (like Bass, the Colonel had a beard and was not Japanese) from a nearby KFC and tossed it off the bridge as an effigy.

According to the urban legend, this impulsive maneuver cost the team greatly, beginning the Curse of the Colonel, which states that the Tigers will not win the championship again until the statue is recovered. Subsequently, numerous attempts had been made to recover the statue, often as part of a variety TV show.

18-year losing streak
After their success in the 1985 series, the Hanshin Tigers began an 18-year losing streak placing last or next-to-last in the league. Brief rallies in 1992 and 1999 brought hope to fans, but they were soon followed with defeat.

During this time attempts were made to recover the statue, including sending divers down and dredging the river, but they all failed. Fans apologized to the store manager, but the statue remained in the canal and the Tigers "cursed".

2002 World Cup
Although the leap into Dōtonbori canal and the Curse of the Colonel is usually associated only with a Hanshin Tigers victory, in 2002, when Japan beat Tunisia in the World Cup, some 500 fans jumped into the canal as a celebration, in spite of heavy police security.

In addition, a Colonel Sanders statue was taken from the storefront of a KFC in nearby Kobe and its hands were cut off, supposedly in imitation of Sharia law.

2003 Central League
In 2003, the Tigers had an unexpectedly strong season. Their chief rivals, the Yomiuri Giants, lost their star player Hideki Matsui to the New York Yankees, while the Tigers saw the return of pitcher Hideki Irabu back to NPB after playing with the Texas Rangers. The Tigers won the Central League to qualify for the Japan Series, and many newspapers speculated that the Curse of the Colonel had finally been broken. The Tigers lost the Japan Series, this time to the Fukuoka Daiei Hawks, so the curse is presumably intact.

Fans were enthusiastic about winning the Central League, and repeated the celebratory leap into Dōtonbori Canal. However, instead of the individual leapers representing the players, over 5,300 fans plunged into the canal.

Many KFC outlets in Kobe and Osaka moved their Colonel Sanders statues inside until the series was over to protect them from rabid Tigers fans. The replacement Colonel Sanders statue in the Dōtonbori KFC branch was bolted down to prevent a repeat of the incident.

Death in the canal

For 24-year-old Hanshin Tigers fan Masaya Shitababa, the 2003 celebration was a tragedy. He drowned in the canal, with all reports being that he had been shoved in by the revelers. To prevent future incidents, the Osaka city council ordered the construction of a new Ebisubashi bridge beginning in 2004, which will make it more difficult for fans to take the celebratory leap should the Curse of the Colonel be broken and the Tigers win again.

Recovery of statue 
The Colonel was finally discovered in the Dōtonbori River on March 10, 2009. Divers who recovered the statue at first thought it was only a large barrel, and shortly after a human corpse, but Hanshin fans on the scene were quick to identify it as the upper body of the long-lost Colonel. The right hand and lower body were found the next day, but the statue is still missing its glasses and left hand. It is said that the only way the curse can be lifted is by returning his long-lost glasses and left hand.

The statue was later recovered (with replacement of new glasses and hand) and returned to KFC Japan. As the KFC restaurant that the statue originally belonged to no longer exists, the statue was now placed in the branch near Koshien Stadium.

In popular culture 
In the video game Sonic Adventure, a statue of an older man with a moustache stands outside of a fast food restaurant in Station Square. Making reference to the curse, a nearby girl sometimes warns the player not to throw it into a river.

In episode 16 of the anime series Kill la Kill the statue can briefly be seen in the background with its head sticking out from the Dōtonbori River.

The Colonel Sanders curse was the first clue in the Connections round of the Horned Viper wall in Episode 26, Series 17 of the popular quiz show Only Connect.

The video game Yakuza 0 contains a reference to the curse in the form of a statue of a chef floating underwater in the river of Sotenbori (a fictional version of dotenbori). The statue can be seen underwater in the cutscene where Majima enters the bed of styx, with the camera lingering on the statue for a bit.

See also 

 Baseball superstition
 Curse of the Bambino – A similar superstition surrounding the Boston Red Sox (American baseball, ended in 2004)
 Curse of the Billy Goat – A similar superstition surrounding the Chicago Cubs (American baseball, ended in 2016)
 Curse of the Black Sox – A similar superstition surrounding the Chicago White Sox (American baseball, ended in 2005)
 Curse of Rocky Colavito – A similar superstition surrounding the Cleveland Indians (currently Guardians) (American baseball, ongoing)
 Curse of Coogan's Bluff – A similar superstition surrounding the San Francisco Giants (American baseball, ended in 2010)
 Sports-related curses

References 

Colonel
Hanshin Tigers
Culture in Osaka
KFC
Japanese urban legends